Hanna Tserakh (born 7 September 1998) is a Belarusian racing cyclist, who currently rides for UCI Women's Continental Team . She rode in the women's scratch event at the 2018 UCI Track Cycling World Championships.

Major Results
2020
 2nd Scratch, UEC European Track Championships

References

External links

1998 births
Living people
Belarusian female cyclists
Place of birth missing (living people)
Cyclists at the 2019 European Games
European Games medalists in cycling
European Games bronze medalists for Belarus